De Kalb is a town in and the county seat of Kemper County, Mississippi, United States. The population was 1,164 at the 2010 census. De Kalb is named after General Johann de Kalb, a Franconian-French military officer who served as a major general in the Continental Army during the American Revolutionary War.

Geography
De Kalb is located in central Kemper County at  (32.769751, -88.650407). Mississippi Highway 16 passes through the north side of the town, leading east  to Scooba and west  to Philadelphia. Mississippi Highway 39 (Main Avenue) passes through the center of De Kalb, leading north  to Shuqualak and south  to Meridian.

Demographics

2020 census

As of the 2020 United States Census, there were 877 people, 480 households, and 292 families residing in the town.

2000 census
As of the census of 2000, there were 972 people, 388 households, and 233 families residing in the town. The population density was 293.5 people per square mile (113.4/km2). There were 444 housing units at an average density of 134.1 per square mile (51.8/km2). The racial makeup of the town was 70.31% African American, 18.56% White, 0.21% Native American, and 0.93% from two or more races. Hispanic or Latino of any race were 0.93% of the population.

There were 388 households, out of which 26.5% had children under the age of 18 living with them, 35.8% were married couples living together, 20.9% had a female householder with no husband present, and 39.7% were non-families. 37.6% of all households were made up of individuals, and 20.9% had someone living alone who was 65 years of age or older. The average household size was 2.28 and the average family size was 3.03.

In the town, the population was spread out, with 22.6% under the age of 18, 9.0% from 18 to 24, 23.0% from 25 to 44, 19.5% from 45 to 64, and 25.8% who were 65 years of age or older. The median age was 42 years. For every 100 females, there were 83.7 males. For every 100 females age 18 and over, there were 73.3 males.

The median income for a household in the town was $21,000, and the median income for a family was $24,886. Males had a median income of $26,477 versus $16,964 for females. The per capita income for the town was $11,171. About 23.3% of families and 28.1% of the population were below the poverty line, including 38.9% of those under age 18 and 21.0% of those age 65 or over.

Education
De Kalb is served by the Kemper County School District.

Notable people
 Eddie Briggs, former Lieutenant Governor of Mississippi
 Bud Brown, former safety for the Miami Dolphins
 Cleo Brown, blues and jazz vocalist and pianist
 John A. Clark, member of the Mississippi State Senate from 1916 to 1920
 Lyscum Elbert Crowson, Methodist minister
 J. H. Rush, physician
 John H. Stennis, member of the Mississippi House of Representatives from 1969 to 1984
 Louis Westerfield, lawyer and former dean of the University of Mississippi School of Law

References

Towns in Kemper County, Mississippi
Towns in Mississippi
County seats in Mississippi
Meridian micropolitan area